Chrysotile is a former mining town in Gila County, Arizona, United States.

References

Populated places in Gila County, Arizona
Ghost towns in Arizona